Hornopirén is a town in the commune of Hualaihué in Palena Province, southern Chile. It lies along the northern portion of Carretera Austral. The town had 3,629 inhabitants as of 2017.
Hornopirén is an important tourist stop on Chile’s Carretera Austral (Highway 7) and serves as the departure point for the bi-modal car ferry system on the Carretera Austral through the Palena Province.

From Hornopirén, a 3:15 long ferry crosses the Comau Fjord in Pumalin Douglass Tompkins National Park. Upon arrival at the embarcadero at Leptepu, a short 10-minute drive takes travelers to the shorter 40-minute crossing at Renihue Fjord to Caleta Gonzalo.

In addition to its strategic position as departure point for the bi-modal car ferry, Hornopirén has modest tourist infrastructure as the gateway to Hornopirén National Park and the Northern Patagonia Fjordlands. Boats can be hired to take tourists to remote hot springs and campgrounds in the fjordlands.

References

Populated places in Palena Province
Populated coastal places in Chile
Populated places in the fjords and channels of Chile
Coasts of Los Lagos Region